Joseph "Pete" Salemi (September 15, 1902 – January 17, 2003) was an Italian American jazz trombonist.

Salemi was born in Corleone in Sicily on September 15, 1902. Salemi was the youngest of three sons and a daughter. He came to the United States in 1914 with his father. As a trombonist, Salemi played with Frank Sinatra and Judy Garland, but is best known for his recording work with the Gene Kardos Orchestra from 1931. He also played with various other big bands.

Salemi played at the inaugurations of both Presidents Harry Truman and Dwight Eisenhower.

References

1902 births
2003 deaths
American centenarians
Italian centenarians
American people of Italian descent
American jazz trombonists
Male trombonists
People from Corleone
20th-century American musicians
20th-century trombonists
20th-century American male musicians
American male jazz musicians
Musicians from the Province of Palermo
Men centenarians